The 1972 United States House of Representatives elections were held on November 7, 1972, to elect U.S. Representatives to serve in the 93rd United States Congress. This was the first election held after the 1970 United States redistricting cycle. It coincided with the landslide reelection victory of President Richard M. Nixon. Nixon's Republican Party managed to gain a net of twelve House of Representatives seats from the Democratic Party, although the Democrats retained a majority.

This was the first election in which citizens at least 18 years of age (instead of 21 and older) could vote, due to the recent passage of the 26th Amendment. This was the last time until 2022 that a Democrat would win a House seat in Alaska.

Special elections 
Six special elections were also held throughout the year, six before November and one concurrent with the November general election.

|-
! 
| Robert Stafford
|  | Republican
| 1960
|  | Incumbent resigned September 16, 1971 when appointed U.S. Senator.New member elected January 7, 1972.Republican hold.Winner was re-elected in November.
| nowrap | 

|-
! 
| George W. Andrews
|  | Democratic
| 1944 
|  | Incumbent died December 25, 1971.New member elected April 4, 1972.Democratic hold.Winner did not run for re-election in November.
| nowrap | 

|-
! 
| Charlotte Thompson Reid
|  | Republican
| 1962
|  | Incumbent resigned October 7, 1971 to become Commissioner on the Federal Communications Commission.New member elected April 4, 1972.Republican hold.Winner was re-elected in November.
| nowrap | 

|-
! 
| James G. Fulton
|  | Republican
| 1944
|  | Incumbent died  October 6, 1971.New member elected April 25, 1972.Republican hold.Winner was not renominated in primary for election to full term in November (see below).
| nowrap | 

|-
! 
| Edwin Edwards
|  | Democratic
| 1965 
|  | Incumbent resigned May 9, 1972 when elected Governor of Louisiana.New member elected September 30, 1972.Democratic hold.Winner was re-elected in November.
| nowrap | 

|-
! 
| Richard Harding Poff
|  | Republican
| 1952
|  | Incumbent resigned August 29, 1972 to become judge of the Supreme Court of Virginia.New member elected November 7, 1972.Republican hold.Winner was also elected the same day to the next term.
| nowrap | 

|}

Summary of results 

Source:

Incumbents retiring

Democratic gains 
 : Fletcher Thompson (R) retired to run for U.S. senator, succeeded by Andrew Young (D)
 : Seymour Halpern (R), retired, succeeded by Lester L. Wolff (D), who was redistricted
 : Page Belcher (R), retired, succeeded by James R. Jones (D)

Democratic holds 
 : David Pryor (D), retired to run for U.S. senator, succeeded by Ray Thornton (D)
 : Roman C. Pucinski (D), retired, succeeded by Frank Annunzio (D), who was redistricted
 : William P. Curlin Jr. (D), retired, succeeded by John B. Breckinridge (D)
 : Speedy Long (D), redistricted and retired, succeeded by Gillis William Long (D), who previously held the seat in the 88th Congress
 : Edward Garmatz (D), redistricted and retired, succeeded by Paul Sarbanes (D)
 : Thomas Abernethy (D), redistricted and retired, succeeded by David R. Bowen (D)
 : William Raleigh Hull Jr. (D), retired, succeeded by Jerry Litton (D)
 : Nick Galifianakis (D), retired to run for U.S. senator, succeeded by Ike Franklin Andrews (D)
 : Alton Lennon (D), retired, succeeded by Charlie Rose (D)
 : Arthur A. Link (D), redistricted retired to run for Governor, succeeded by Mark Andrews (R), who was redistricted
 : Ed Edmondson (D), retired to run for U.S. senator, succeeded by Clem McSpadden (D)
 : Ray Blanton (D), retired to run for U.S. senator, succeeded by Ed Jones (D), who was redistricted
 : John Dowdy (D), retired, succeeded by Charles Wilson (D)

Republican gains 
 : Elizabeth B. Andrews (D), redistricted and retired, succeeded by William Louis Dickinson (R)
 : Roman C. Pucinski (D), retired, succeeded by Frank Annunzio (D), who was redistricted
 : Patrick T. Caffery (D), retired, succeeded by Dave Treen (R)
 : William Hathaway (D), retired to run for U.S. senator, succeeded by William Cohen (R)
 : Charles H. Griffin (D), redistricted and retired, succeeded by Thad Cochran (R)
 : William M. Colmer (D), retired, succeeded by Trent Lott (R)
 : James Abourezk (D), retired to run for U.S. senator, succeeded by James Abdnor (R)
 : Watkins Moorman Abbitt (D), retired, succeeded by Robert Daniel (R)

Republican holds 
 : H. Allen Smith (R), retired, succeeded by Carlos Moorhead (R)
 : James A. McClure (R), retired to run for U.S. senator, succeeded by Steve Symms (R)
 : Cliffard D. Carlson (R), retired, succeeded by Leslie C. Arends (R), who was redistricted
 : William L. Springer (R), retired, succeeded by Edward Rell Madigan (R)
 : Durward Gorham Hall (R), retired, succeeded by Gene Taylor (R)
 : Florence P. Dwyer (R), retired, succeeded by Matthew John Rinaldo (R)
 : Alexander Pirnie (R), redistricted and retired, succeeded by Donald J. Mitchell (R)
 : John H. Terry (R), redistricted and retired, succeeded by William F. Walsh (R)
 : Charles R. Jonas (R), retired, succeeded by James G. Martin (R)
 : William Moore McCulloch (R), retired, succeeded by Tennyson Guyer (R)
 : Jackson Edward Betts (R), retired, succeeded by Walter E. Powell (R), who was redistricted
 : Frank T. Bow (R), retired, succeeded by Ralph Regula (R)
 : J. Irving Whalley (R), retired, succeeded by John P. Saylor (R), who was redistricted
 : William L. Scott (R), retired to run for U.S. senator, succeeded by Stanford Parris (R)
 : Thomas Pelly (R), retired, succeeded by Joel Pritchard (R)
 : John W. Byrnes (R), retired, succeeded by Harold Vernon Froehlich (R)

Incumbents defeated

Incumbents defeated in primary 

 : George P. Miller (D)
 : John G. Schmitz (R)
 : Wayne Aspinall (D)
 : George Elliott Hagan (D)
 : Jack H. McDonald (R)
 : Walter S. Baring Jr. (D)
 : Cornelius Edward Gallagher (D)
 : Emanuel Celler (D)
 : James H. Scheuer (D)
 : James A. Byrne (D)
 : William Sheldrick Conover (R)
 : John L. McMillan (D)
 : James Kee (D)

Incumbents defeated in general election 
: Mike McKevitt (R)
: John S. Monagan (D)
: Abner J. Mikva (D)
: Andrew Jacobs Jr. (D)
: Fred Schwengel (R)
: John Henry Kyl (R)
: Louise Day Hicks (D)
: John G. Dow (D)
: William Anderson (D)
: Earle Cabell (D)
: Graham B. Purcell Jr. (D)
: Sherman P. Lloyd (R)
: Alvin E. O'Konski (R)

Alabama 

Alabama was reapportioned from 8 to 7 seats and eliminated the old , dividing it between the old 2nd and 4th and making compensating boundary changes elsewhere.

|-
! 
| Jack Edwards
|  | Republican
| 1964
| Incumbent re-elected.
| nowrap | 

|-
! rowspan=2 | 
| William Louis Dickinson
|  | Republican
| 1964
| Incumbent re-elected.
| rowspan=2 nowrap | 

|-
| Elizabeth B. Andrews
|  | Democratic
| 1972 
|  | Incumbent retired.Democratic loss.

|-
! 
| Bill Nichols
|  | Democratic
| 1966
| Incumbent re-elected.
| nowrap | 

|-
! 
| Tom Bevill
|  | Democratic
| 1966
| Incumbent re-elected.
| nowrap | 

|-
! 
| Robert E. Jones Jr.
|  | Democratic
| 1947 
| Incumbent re-elected.
| nowrap | 

|-
! 
| John Hall Buchanan Jr.
|  | Republican
| 1964
| Incumbent re-elected.
| nowrap | 

|-
! 
| Walter Flowers
|  | Democratic
| 1968
| Incumbent re-elected.
| nowrap | 

|}

Alaska 

Incumbent Nick Begich won re-election three weeks after having disappeared in a plane crash October 16; challenger Don Young would later win a March special election after Begich was declared dead on December 29.

|-
! 
| Nick Begich
|  | Democratic
| 1970
| Incumbent re-elected posthumously.
| nowrap | 

|}

Arizona 

Arizona was reapportioned from 3 seats to 4 and carved a new district in the Phoenix suburbs and the northeast from parts of the existing districts.

|-
! 
| John Jacob Rhodes
|  | Republican
| 1952
| Incumbent re-elected.
| nowrap | 

|-
! 
| Mo Udall
|  | Democratic
| 1961 
| Incumbent re-elected.
| nowrap | 

|-
! 
| Sam Steiger
|  | Republican
| 1966
| Incumbent re-elected.
| nowrap | 

|-
! 
| colspan=3 | None (district created)
|  | New seat.New member elected.Republican gain.
| nowrap | 

|}

Arkansas 

|-
! 
| William Vollie Alexander Jr.
|  | Democratic
| 1968
| Incumbent re-elected.
| nowrap | 

|-
! 
| Wilbur Mills
|  | Democratic
| 1938
| Incumbent re-elected.
| nowrap | 

|-
! 
| John Paul Hammerschmidt
|  | Republican
| 1966
| Incumbent re-elected.
| nowrap | 

|-
! 
| David Pryor
|  | Democratic
| 1966
|  | Retired to run for U.S. Senator.New member elected.Democratic hold.
| nowrap | 

|}

California 

California was reapportioned from 38 to 43 seats, adding one seat in the Bay Area, one in the Central Valley, and 3 in southern California; three went to Democrats, two to Republicans. Despite a retirement and two lost renominations, both parties held their seats in this election, bringing the Democrats up from 20 seats to 23 and the Republicans up from 18 seats to 20.

|-
! 
| Donald H. Clausen
|  | Republican
| 1963
| Incumbent re-elected.
| nowrap | 

|-
! 
| Harold T. Johnson
|  | Democratic
| 1958
| Incumbent re-elected.
| nowrap | 

|-
! 
| John E. Moss
|  | Democratic
| 1952
| Incumbent re-elected.
| nowrap | 

|-
! 
| Robert L. Leggett
|  | Democratic
| 1962
| Incumbent re-elected.
| nowrap | 

|-
! 
| Phillip Burton
|  | Democratic
| 1964
| Incumbent re-elected.
| nowrap | 

|-
! 
| William S. Mailliard
|  | Republican
| 1952
| Incumbent re-elected.
| nowrap | 

|-
! 
| Ron Dellums
|  | Democratic
| 1970
| Incumbent re-elected.
| nowrap | 

|-
! 
| George P. Miller
|  | Democratic
| 1944
|  | Incumbent lost renomination.New member elected.Democratic hold.
| nowrap | 

|-
! 
| Don Edwards
|  | Democratic
| 1962
| Incumbent re-elected.
| nowrap | 

|-
! 
| Charles S. Gubser
|  | Republican
| 1952
| Incumbent re-elected.
| nowrap | 

|-
! 
| colspan=3 | None (district created)
|  | New seat.New member elected.Democratic gain.
| nowrap | 

|-
! 
| Burt L. Talcott
|  | Republican
| 1962
| Incumbent re-elected.
| nowrap | 

|-
! 
| Charles M. Teague
|  | Republican
| 1954
| Incumbent re-elected.
| nowrap | 

|-
! 
| Jerome Waldie
|  | Democratic
| 1966
| Incumbent re-elected.
| nowrap | 

|-
! 
| John J. McFall
|  | Democratic
| 1956
| Incumbent re-elected.
| nowrap | 

|-
! 
| B. F. Sisk
|  | Democratic
| 1954
| Incumbent re-elected.
| nowrap | 

|-
! 
| Pete McCloskey
|  | Republican
| 1967
| Incumbent re-elected.
| nowrap | 

|-
! 
| Bob Mathias
|  | Republican
| 1966
| Incumbent re-elected.
| nowrap | 

|-
! 
| Chet Holifield
|  | Democratic
| 1942
| Incumbent re-elected.
| nowrap | 

|-
! 
| H. Allen Smith
|  | Republican
| 1956
|  | Incumbent retired.New member elected.Republican hold.
| nowrap | 

|-
! 
| Augustus Hawkins
|  | Democratic
| 1962
| Incumbent re-elected.
| nowrap | 

|-
! 
| James C. Corman
|  | Democratic
| 1960
| Incumbent re-elected.
| nowrap | 

|-
! 
| Del M. Clawson
|  | Republican
| 1963
| Incumbent re-elected.
| nowrap | 

|-
! 
| John H. Rousselot
|  | Republican
| 19601962 1970 
| Incumbent re-elected.
| nowrap | 

|-
! 
| Charles E. Wiggins
|  | Republican
| 1966
| Incumbent re-elected.
| nowrap | 

|-
! 
| Thomas M. Rees
|  | Democratic
| 1965
| Incumbent re-elected.
| nowrap | 

|-
! 
| Barry Goldwater Jr.
|  | Republican
| 1969
| Incumbent re-elected.
| nowrap | 

|-
! 
| Alphonzo E. Bell Jr.
|  | Republican
| 1960
| Incumbent re-elected.
| nowrap | 

|-
! 
| George E. Danielson
|  | Democratic
| 1970
| Incumbent re-elected.
| nowrap | 

|-
! 
| Edward R. Roybal
|  | Democratic
| 1962
| Incumbent re-elected.
| nowrap | 

|-
! 
| Charles H. Wilson
|  | Democratic
| 1962
| Incumbent re-elected.
| nowrap | 

|-
! 
| Craig Hosmer
|  | Republican
| 1952
| Incumbent re-elected.
| nowrap | 

|-
! 
| Jerry Pettis
|  | Republican
| 1966
| Incumbent re-elected.
| nowrap | 

|-
! 
| Richard T. Hanna
|  | Democratic
| 1962
| Incumbent re-elected.
| nowrap | 

|-
! 
| Glenn M. Anderson
|  | Democratic
| 1968
| Incumbent re-elected.
| nowrap | 

|-
! 
| colspan=3 | None (district created)
|  | New seat.New member elected.Republican gain.
| nowrap | 

|-
! 
| colspan=3 | None (district created)
|  | New seat.New member elected.Democratic gain.
| nowrap | 

|-
! 
| colspan=3 | None (district created)
|  | New seat.New member elected.Democratic gain.
| nowrap | 

|-
! 
| John G. Schmitz
|  | Republican
| 1970
|  | Incumbent lost renomination.New member elected.Republican hold.
| nowrap | 

|-
! 
| Bob Wilson
|  | Republican
| 1952
| Incumbent re-elected.
| nowrap | 

|-
! 
| Lionel Van Deerlin
|  | Democratic
| 1962
| Incumbent re-elected.
| nowrap | 

|-
! 
| colspan=3 | None (district created)
|  | New seat.New member elected.Republican gain.
| nowrap | 

|-
! 
| Victor Veysey
|  | Republican
| 1970
| Incumbent re-elected.
| nowrap | 

|}

Colorado 

|-
! 
| Mike McKevitt
|  | Republican
| 1970
|  | Incumbent lost re-election.New member elected.Democratic gain.
| nowrap | 

|-
! 
| Donald G. Brotzman
|  | Republican
| 19621964 1966
| Incumbent re-elected.
| nowrap | 

|-
! 
| Frank Evans
|  | Democratic
| 1964
| Incumbent re-elected.
| nowrap | 

|-
! 
| Wayne N. Aspinall
|  | Democratic
| 1948
|  | Incumbent lost renomination.New member elected.Republican gain.
| nowrap | 

|-
! 
| colspan=3 | None (district created)
|  | New seat.New member elected.Republican gain.
| nowrap | 

|}

Connecticut 

|-
! 
| William R. Cotter
|  | Democratic
| 1970
| Incumbent re-elected.
| nowrap | 

|-
! 
| Robert H. Steele
|  | Republican
| 1970
| Incumbent re-elected.
| nowrap | 

|-
! 
| Robert Giaimo
|  | Democratic
| 1958
| Incumbent re-elected.
| nowrap | 

|-
! 
| Stewart McKinney
|  | Republican
| 1970
| Incumbent re-elected.
| nowrap | 

|-
! 
| John S. Monagan
|  | Democratic
| 1958
|  | Incumbent lost re-election.New member elected.Republican gain.
| nowrap | 

|-
! 
| Ella Grasso
|  | Democratic
| 1970
| Incumbent re-elected.
| nowrap | 

|}

Delaware 

|-
! 
| Pete du Pont
|  | Republican
| 1970
| Incumbent re-elected.
| nowrap | 

|}

Florida 

Florida was reapportioned from 12 to 15 seats, adding a seat in central and two in south Florida.

|-
! 
| Bob Sikes
|  | Democratic
| 19401944 1974
| Incumbent re-elected.
| nowrap | 

|-
! 
| Don Fuqua
|  | Democratic
| 1962
| Incumbent re-elected.
| nowrap | 

|-
! 
| Charles E. Bennett
|  | Democratic
| 1948
| Incumbent re-elected.
| nowrap | 

|-
! 
| Bill Chappell
|  | Democratic
| 1968
| Incumbent re-elected.
| nowrap | 

|-
! 
| colspan=3 | None (district created)
|  | New seat.New member elected.Democratic gain.
| nowrap | 

|-
! 
| Bill Young
|  | Republican
| 1970
| Incumbent re-elected.
| nowrap | 

|-
! 
| Sam Gibbons
|  | Democratic
| 1962
| Incumbent re-elected.
| nowrap | 

|-
! 
| James A. Haley
|  | Democratic
| 1952
| Incumbent re-elected.
| nowrap | 

|-
! 
| Louis Frey Jr.
|  | Republican
| 1968
| Incumbent re-elected.
| nowrap | 

|-
! 
| colspan=3 | None (district created)
|  | New seat.New member elected.Republican gain.
| nowrap | 

|-
! 
| Paul Rogers
|  | Democratic
| 1954
| Incumbent re-elected.
| nowrap | 

|-
! 
| J. Herbert Burke
|  | Republican
| 1966
| Incumbent re-elected.
| nowrap | 

|-
! 
| colspan=3 | None (district created)
|  | New seat.New member elected.Democratic gain.
| nowrap | 

|-
! 
| Claude Pepper
|  | Democratic
| 1962
| Incumbent re-elected.
| nowrap | 

|-
! 
| Dante Fascell
|  | Democratic
| 1954
| Incumbent re-elected.
| nowrap | 

|}

Georgia 

|-
! 
| George Elliott Hagan
|  | Democratic
| 1960
|  | Incumbent lost renomination.New member elected.Democratic hold.
| nowrap | 

|-
! 
| Dawson Mathis
|  | Democratic
| 1970
| Incumbent re-elected.
| nowrap | 

|-
! 
| Jack Brinkley
|  | Democratic
| 1966
| Incumbent re-elected.
| nowrap | 

|-
! 
| Benjamin B. Blackburn
|  | Republican
| 1966
| Incumbent re-elected.
| nowrap | 

|-
! 
| Fletcher Thompson
|  | Republican
| 1966
|  | Retired to run for U.S. Senator.New member elected.Democratic gain.
| nowrap | 

|-
! 
| John Flynt
|  | Democratic
| 1954
| Incumbent re-elected.
| nowrap | 

|-
! 
| John William Davis
|  | Democratic
| 1960
| Incumbent re-elected.
| nowrap | 

|-
! 
| W. S. Stuckey Jr.
|  | Democratic
| 1966
| Incumbent re-elected.
| nowrap | 

|-
! 
| Phillip M. Landrum
|  | Democratic
| 1952
| Incumbent re-elected.
| nowrap | 

|-
! 
| Robert Grier Stephens Jr.
|  | Democratic
| 1960
| Incumbent re-elected.
| nowrap | 

|}

Hawaii 

|-
! 
| Spark Matsunaga
|  | Democratic
| 1962
| Incumbent re-elected.
| nowrap | 

|-
! 
| Patsy Mink
|  | Democratic
| 1964
| Incumbent re-elected.
| nowrap | 

|}

Idaho 

|-
! 
| James A. McClure
|  | Republican
| 1966
|  | Retired to run for U.S. Senator.New member elected.Republican hold.
| nowrap | 

|-
! 
| Orval H. Hansen
|  | Republican
| 1968
| Incumbent re-elected.
| nowrap | 

|}

Illinois 

|-
! 
| Ralph Metcalfe
|  | Democratic
| 1970
| Incumbent re-elected.
| nowrap | 

|-
! 
| Morgan F. Murphy
|  | Democratic
| 1970
| Incumbent re-elected.
| nowrap | 

|-
! 
| colspan=3 | None (district created)
|  | New seat.New member elected.Republican gain.
| nowrap | 

|-
! 
| Ed Derwinski
|  | Republican
| 1958
| Incumbent re-elected.
| nowrap | 

|-
! 
| John C. Kluczynski
|  | Democratic
| 1950
| Incumbent re-elected.
| nowrap | 

|-
! 
| Harold R. Collier
|  | Republican
| 1956
| Incumbent re-elected.
| nowrap | 

|-
! 
| George W. Collins
|  | Democratic
| 1970
| Incumbent re-elected.
| nowrap | 

|-
! 
| Dan Rostenkowski
|  | Democratic
| 1958
| Incumbent re-elected.
| nowrap | 

|-
! 
| Sidney R. Yates
|  | Democratic
| 19481962 1964
| Incumbent re-elected.
| nowrap | 

|-
! 
| Abner Mikva
|  | Democratic
| 1968
|  | Incumbent lost re-election.New member elected.Republican gain.
| nowrap | 

|-
! rowspan=2 | 
| Roman Pucinski
|  | Democratic
| 1958
|  | Retired to run for U.S. Senator.Democratic loss.
| rowspan=2 nowrap | 

|-
| Frank Annunzio
|  | Democratic
| 1964
| Incumbent re-elected.

|-
! 
| Phil Crane
|  | Republican
| 1969
| Incumbent re-elected.
| nowrap | 

|-
! 
| Robert McClory
|  | Republican
| 1962
| Incumbent re-elected.
| nowrap | 

|-
! 
| John N. Erlenborn
|  | Republican
| 1964
| Incumbent re-elected.
| nowrap | 

|-
! rowspan=2 | 
| Cliffard D. Carlson
|  | Republican
| 1972 
|  | Incumbent retired.Republican loss.
| rowspan=2 nowrap | 

|-
| Leslie C. Arends
|  | Republican
| 1934
| Incumbent re-elected.

|-
! 
| John B. Anderson
|  | Republican
| 1960
| Incumbent re-elected.
| nowrap | 

|-
! 
| colspan=3 | None (district created)
|  | New seat.New member elected.Republican gain.
| nowrap | 

|-
! 
| Robert H. Michel
|  | Republican
| 1956
| Incumbent re-elected.
| nowrap | 

|-
! 
| Tom Railsback
|  | Republican
| 1966
| Incumbent re-elected.
| nowrap | 

|-
! 
| Paul Findley
|  | Republican
| 1960
| Incumbent re-elected.
| nowrap | 

|-
! 
| William L. Springer
|  | Republican
| 1950
|  | Incumbent retired.New member elected.Republican hold.
| nowrap | 

|-
! 
| George E. Shipley
|  | Democratic
| 1958
| Incumbent re-elected.
| nowrap | 

|-
! 
| Melvin Price
|  | Democratic
| 1944
| Incumbent re-elected.
| nowrap | 

|-
! 
| Kenneth J. Gray
|  | Democratic
| 1954
| Incumbent re-elected.
| nowrap | 

|}

Indiana 

|-
! 
| Ray Madden
|  | Democratic
| 1942
| Incumbent re-elected.
| nowrap | 

|-
! 
| Earl Landgrebe
|  | Republican
| 1968
| Incumbent re-elected.
| nowrap | 

|-
! 
| John Brademas
|  | Democratic
| 1958
| Incumbent re-elected.
| nowrap | 

|-
! 
| J. Edward Roush
|  | Democratic
| 19581968 1970
| Incumbent re-elected.
| nowrap | 

|-
! 
| Elwood Hillis
|  | Republican
| 1970
| Incumbent re-elected.
| nowrap | 

|-
! 
| William G. Bray
|  | Republican
| 1950
| Incumbent re-elected.
| nowrap | 

|-
! 
| John T. Myers
|  | Republican
| 1966
| Incumbent re-elected.
| nowrap | 

|-
! 
| Roger H. Zion
|  | Republican
| 1966
| Incumbent re-elected.
| nowrap | 

|-
! 
| Lee H. Hamilton
|  | Democratic
| 1964
| Incumbent re-elected.
| nowrap | 

|-
! 
| David W. Dennis
|  | Republican
| 1968
| Incumbent re-elected.
| nowrap | 

|-
! 
| Andrew Jacobs Jr.
|  | Democratic
| 1964
|  | Incumbent lost re-election.New member elected.Republican gain.
| nowrap | 

|}

Iowa 

Iowa was reapportioned from 7 seats to 6, dividing the old  around Des Moines between its neighbors. Its incumbent, Neal Smith, won again in the south-central Iowa .

|-
! 
| Fred Schwengel
|  | Republican
| 19541964 1966
|  | Incumbent lost re-election.New member elected.Democratic gain.
| nowrap | 

|-
! 
| John C. Culver
|  | Democratic
| 1964
| Incumbent re-elected.
| nowrap | 

|-
! 
| H. R. Gross
|  | Republican
| 1948
| Incumbent re-elected.
| nowrap | 

|-
! rowspan=2 | 
| John Henry Kyl
|  | Republican
| 1959 1964 1966
|  | Incumbent lost re-election.Republican loss.
| rowspan=2 nowrap | 

|-
| Neal Smith
|  | Democratic
| 1958
| Incumbent re-elected.

|-
! 
| William J. Scherle
|  | Republican
| 1966
| Incumbent re-elected.
| nowrap | 

|-
! 
| Wiley Mayne
|  | Republican
| 1966
| Incumbent re-elected.
| nowrap | 

|}

Kansas 

|-
! 
| Keith Sebelius
|  | Republican
| 1968
| Incumbent re-elected.
| nowrap | 

|-
! 
| William R. Roy
|  | Democratic
| 1970
| Incumbent re-elected.
| nowrap | 

|-
! 
| Larry Winn
|  | Republican
| 1966
| Incumbent re-elected.
| nowrap | 

|-
! 
| Garner E. Shriver
|  | Republican
| 1960
| Incumbent re-elected.
| nowrap | 

|-
! 
| Joe Skubitz
|  | Republican
| 1962
| Incumbent re-elected.
| nowrap | 

|}

Kentucky 

|-
! 
| Frank Stubblefield
|  | Democratic
| 1958
| Incumbent re-elected.
| nowrap | 

|-
! 
| William Natcher
|  | Democratic
| 1953 
| Incumbent re-elected.
| nowrap | 

|-
! 
| Romano Mazzoli
|  | Democratic
| 1970
| Incumbent re-elected.
| nowrap | 

|-
! 
| Gene Snyder
|  | Republican
| 19621964 1966
| Incumbent re-elected.
| nowrap | 

|-
! 
| Tim Lee Carter
|  | Republican
| 1964
| Incumbent re-elected.
| nowrap | 

|-
! 
| William P. Curlin Jr.
|  | Democratic
| 1971 
|  | Incumbent retired.New member elected.Democratic hold.
| nowrap | 

|-
! 
| Carl D. Perkins
|  | Democratic
| 1948
| Incumbent re-elected.
| nowrap | 

|}

Louisiana 

Louisiana stayed at eight house seats following the 1970 census, but the Eighth District's boundaries were radically altered. New governor Edwin W. Edwards  ordered the district to take in territory far to the south and east of its traditional base of Alexandria, which included many African-American and progressive white voters. The change was largely regarded as an election deal between Edwards and former Rep. Gillis Long, who finished third in the Democratic Primary in the 1971 Louisiana Governor's Election. Long easily won back the Eighth District seat he lost in 1964.

|-
! 
| F. Edward Hébert
|  | Democratic
| 1940
| Incumbent re-elected.
| nowrap | 

|-
! 
| Hale Boggs
|  | Democratic
| 19401942 1946
| Incumbent re-elected posthumously.
| nowrap | 

|-
! 
| Patrick T. Caffery
|  | Democratic
| 1968
|  | Incumbent retired.New member elected.Republican gain.
| nowrap | 

|-
! 
| Joe Waggonner
|  | Democratic
| 1961
| Incumbent re-elected.
| nowrap | 

|-
! 
| Otto Passman
|  | Democratic
| 1946
| Incumbent re-elected.
| nowrap | 

|-
! 
| John Rarick
|  | Democratic
| 1966
| Incumbent re-elected.
| nowrap | 

|-
! 
| John Breaux
|  | Democratic
| 1972 
| Incumbent re-elected.
| nowrap | 

|-
! 
| Speedy Long
|  | Democratic
| 1964
|  | Incumbent retired.New member elected.Democratic hold.
| nowrap | 

|}

Maine 

|-
! 
| Peter Kyros
|  | Democratic
| 1966
| Incumbent re-elected.
| nowrap | 

|-
! 
| William Hathaway
|  | Democratic
| 1964
|  | Retired to run for U.S. Senator.New member elected.Republican gain.
| nowrap | 

|}

Maryland 

Maryland's redistricting eliminated a seat in Baltimore in favor of an additional seat in the DC suburbs.

|-
! 
| William Oswald Mills
|  | Republican
| 1971 
| Incumbent re-elected.
| nowrap | 

|-
! 
| Clarence Long
|  | Democratic
| 1962
| Incumbent re-elected.
| nowrap | 

|-
! rowspan=2 | 
| Edward Garmatz
|  | Democratic
| 1947 
|  | Incumbent retired.Democratic loss.
| rowspan=2 nowrap | 

|-
| Paul Sarbanes
|  | Democratic
| 1970
| Incumbent re-elected.

|-
! 
| colspan=3 | None (district created)
|  | New seat.New member elected.Republican gain.
| nowrap | 

|-
! 
| Lawrence Hogan
|  | Republican
| 1968
| Incumbent re-elected.
| nowrap | 

|-
! 
| Goodloe Byron
|  | Democratic
| 1970
| Incumbent re-elected.
| nowrap | 

|-
! 
| Parren Mitchell
|  | Democratic
| 1970
| Incumbent re-elected.
| nowrap | 

|-
! 
| Gilbert Gude
|  | Republican
| 1966
| Incumbent re-elected.
| nowrap | 

|}

Massachusetts 

|-
! 
| Silvio O. Conte
|  | Republican
| 1958
| Incumbent re-elected.
| nowrap | 

|-
! 
| Edward Boland
|  | Democratic
| 1952
| Incumbent re-elected.
| nowrap | 

|-
! 
| Harold Donohue
|  | Democratic
| 1946
| Incumbent re-elected.
| nowrap | 

|-
! 
| Robert Drinan
|  | Democratic
| 1970
| Incumbent re-elected.
| nowrap | 

|-
! 
| F. Bradford Morse
|  | Republican
| 1960
|  | Resigned when appointed to United NationsRepublican hold.
| nowrap | 

|-
! 
| Michael J. Harrington
|  | Democratic
| 1969 
| Incumbent re-elected.
| nowrap | 

|-
! 
| Torbert Macdonald
|  | Democratic
| 1954
| Incumbent re-elected.
| nowrap | 

|-
! 
| Tip O'Neill
|  | Democratic
| 1952
| Incumbent re-elected.
| nowrap | 

|-
! 
| Louise Day Hicks
|  | Democratic
| 1970
|  | Incumbent lost re-election.New member elected.Independent Democratic gain.
| nowrap | 

|-
! 
| Margaret Heckler
|  | Republican
| 1966
| Incumbent re-elected.
| nowrap | 

|-
! 
| James A. Burke
|  | Democratic
| 1958
| Incumbent re-elected.
| nowrap | 

|-
! 
| Hastings Keith
|  | Republican
| 1958
|  | Incumbent retired.New member elected.Democratic gain.
| nowrap | 

|}

Michigan 

|-
! 
| John Conyers Jr.
|  | Democratic
| 1964
| Incumbent re-elected.
| nowrap | 

|-
! 
| Marvin L. Esch
|  | Republican
| 1966
| Incumbent re-elected.
| nowrap | 

|-
! 
| Garry E. Brown
|  | Republican
| 1966
| Incumbent re-elected.
| nowrap | 

|-
! 
| J. Edward Hutchinson
|  | Republican
| 1962
| Incumbent re-elected.
| nowrap | 

|-
! 
| Gerald Ford
|  | Republican
| 1948
| Incumbent re-elected.
| nowrap | 

|-
! 
| Charles E. Chamberlain
|  | Republican
| 1956
| Incumbent re-elected.
| nowrap | 

|-
! 
| Donald Riegle
|  | Republican
| 1966
| Incumbent re-elected.
| nowrap | 

|-
! 
| R. James Harvey
|  | Republican
| 1960
| Incumbent re-elected.
| nowrap | 

|-
! 
| Guy Vander Jagt
|  | Republican
| 1966
| Incumbent re-elected.
| nowrap | 

|-
! 
| Elford Albin Cederberg
|  | Republican
| 1952
| Incumbent re-elected.
| nowrap | 

|-
! 
| Philip Ruppe
|  | Republican
| 1966
| Incumbent re-elected.
| nowrap | 

|-
! 
| James G. O'Hara
|  | Democratic
| 1958
| Incumbent re-elected.
| nowrap | 

|-
! 
| Charles Diggs
|  | Democratic
| 1954
| Incumbent re-elected.
| nowrap | 

|-
! 
| Lucien Nedzi
|  | Democratic
| 1961 
| Incumbent re-elected.
| nowrap | 

|-
! 
| William D. Ford
|  | Democratic
| 1964
| Incumbent re-elected.
| nowrap | 

|-
! 
| John D. Dingell Jr.
|  | Democratic
| 1955 
| Incumbent re-elected.
| nowrap | 

|-
! 
| Martha W. Griffiths
|  | Democratic
| 1954
| Incumbent re-elected.
| nowrap | 

|-
! 
| colspan=3 | None (district created)
|  | New seat.New member elected.Republican gain.
| nowrap | 

|-
! rowspan=2 | 
| Jack H. McDonald
|  | Republican
| 1966
|  | Incumbent lost renomination.Republican loss.
| rowspan=2 nowrap | 

|-
| William Broomfield
|  | Republican
| 1956
| Incumbent re-elected.

|}

Minnesota 

|-
! 
| Al Quie
|  | Republican
| 1958
| Incumbent re-elected.
| nowrap | 

|-
! 
| Ancher Nelsen
|  | Republican
| 1958
| Incumbent re-elected.
| nowrap | 

|-
! 
| Bill Frenzel
|  | Republican
| 1970
| Incumbent re-elected.
| nowrap | 

|-
! 
| Joseph Karth
|  | 
| 1958
| Incumbent re-elected.
| nowrap | 

|-
! 
| Donald M. Fraser
|  | 
| 1962
| Incumbent re-elected.
| nowrap | 

|-
! 
| John M. Zwach
|  | Republican
| 1966
| Incumbent re-elected.
| nowrap | 

|-
! 
| Robert Bergland
|  | 
| 1970
| Incumbent re-elected.
| nowrap | 

|-
! 
| John Blatnik
|  | 
| 1946
| Incumbent re-elected.
| nowrap | 

|}

Mississippi 

|-
! 
| Jamie Whitten
|  | Democratic
| 1941 
| Incumbent re-elected.
| nowrap | 

|-
! 
| Thomas Abernethy
|  | Democratic
| 1942
|  | Incumbent retired.New member elected.Democratic hold.
| nowrap | 

|-
! 
| Sonny Montgomery
|  | Democratic
| 1966
| Incumbent re-elected.
| nowrap | 

|-
! 
| Charles H. Griffin
|  | Democratic
| 1968
|  | Incumbent retired.New member elected.Republican gain.
| nowrap | 

|-
! 
| William M. Colmer
|  | Democratic
| 1932
|  | Incumbent retired.New member elected.Republican gain.
| nowrap | 

|}

Missouri 

|-
! 
| Bill Clay
|  | Democratic
| 1968
| Incumbent re-elected.
| nowrap | 

|-
! 
| James W. Symington
|  | Democratic
| 1968
| Incumbent re-elected.
| nowrap | 

|-
! 
| Leonor Sullivan
|  | Democratic
| 1952
| Incumbent re-elected.
| nowrap | 

|-
! 
| William J. Randall
|  | Democratic
| 1959 
| Incumbent re-elected.
| nowrap | 

|-
! 
| Richard Walker Bolling
|  | Democratic
| 1948
| Incumbent re-elected.
| nowrap | 

|-
! 
| William Raleigh Hull Jr.
|  | Democratic
| 1954
|  | Incumbent retired.New member elected.Democratic hold.
| nowrap | 

|-
! 
| Durward Gorham Hall
|  | Republican
| 1960
|  | Incumbent retired.New member elected.Republican hold.
| nowrap | 

|-
! 
| Richard Howard Ichord Jr.
|  | Democratic
| 1960
| Incumbent re-elected.
| nowrap | 

|-
! 
| William L. Hungate
|  | Democratic
| 1964
| Incumbent re-elected.
| nowrap | 

|-
! 
| Bill Burlison
|  | Democratic
| 1968
| Incumbent re-elected.
| nowrap | 

|}

Montana 

|-
! 
| Richard G. Shoup
|  | Republican
| 1970
| Incumbent re-elected.
| nowrap | 

|-
! 
| John Melcher
|  | Democratic
| 1969 
| Incumbent re-elected.
| nowrap | 

|}

Nebraska 

|-
! 
| Charles Thone
|  | Republican
| 1970
| Incumbent re-elected.
| nowrap | 

|-
! 
| John Y. McCollister
|  | Republican
| 1970
| Incumbent re-elected.
| nowrap | 

|-
! 
| David Martin
|  | Republican
| 1960
| Incumbent re-elected.
| nowrap | 

|}

Nevada 

|-
! 
| Walter S. Baring Jr.
|  | Democratic
| 19481952 1956
|  | Incumbent lost renomination.New member elected.Republican gain.
| nowrap | 

|}

New Hampshire 

|-
! 
| Louis C. Wyman
|  | Republican
| 19621964 1966
| Incumbent re-elected.
| nowrap | 

|-
! 
| James Colgate Cleveland
|  | Republican
| 1962
| Incumbent re-elected.
| nowrap | 

|}

New Jersey 

|-
! 
| John E. Hunt
|  | Republican
| 1966
| Incumbent re-elected.
| nowrap | 

|-
! 
| Charles W. Sandman Jr.
|  | Republican
| 1966
| Incumbent re-elected.
| nowrap | 

|-
! 
| James J. Howard
|  | Democratic
| 1964
| Incumbent re-elected.
| nowrap | 

|-
! 
| Frank Thompson
|  | Democratic
| 1954
| Incumbent re-elected.
| nowrap | 

|-
! 
| Peter Frelinghuysen Jr.
|  | Republican
| 1952
| Incumbent re-elected.
| nowrap | 

|-
! 
| Edwin B. Forsythe
|  | Republican
| 1970
| Incumbent re-elected.
| nowrap | 

|-
! 
| William B. Widnall
|  | Republican
| 1950
| Incumbent re-elected.
| nowrap | 

|-
! 
| Robert A. Roe
|  | Democratic
| 1970
| Incumbent re-elected.
| nowrap | 

|-
! 
| Henry Helstoski
|  | Democratic
| 1964
| Incumbent re-elected.
| nowrap | 

|-
! 
| Peter W. Rodino
|  | Democratic
| 1948
| Incumbent re-elected.
| nowrap | 

|-
! 
| Joseph Minish
|  | Democratic
| 1962
| Incumbent re-elected.
| nowrap | 

|-
! 
| Florence P. Dwyer
|  | Republican
| 1956
|  | Incumbent retired.New member elected.Republican hold.
| nowrap | 

|-
! 
| colspan=3 | None (district created)
|  | New seat.New member elected.Republican gain.
| nowrap | 

|-
! rowspan=2 | 
| Dominick V. Daniels
|  | Democratic
| 1958
| Incumbent re-elected.
| rowspan=2 nowrap | 

|-
| Cornelius Gallagher
|  | Democratic
| 1958
|  | Incumbent lost renomination.Democratic loss.

|-
! 
| Edward J. Patten
|  | Democratic
| 1962
| Incumbent re-elected.
| nowrap | 

|}

New Mexico 

|-
! 
| Manuel Lujan Jr.
|  | Republican
| 1968
| Incumbent re-elected.
| nowrap | 

|-
! 
| Harold L. Runnels
|  | Democratic
| 1970
| Incumbent re-elected.
| nowrap | 

|}

New York 

|-
! 
| Otis G. Pike
|  | Democratic
| 1960
| Incumbent re-elected.
| nowrap | 

|-
! 
| James R. Grover Jr.
|  | Republican
| 1962
| Incumbent re-elected.
| nowrap | 

|-
! 
| colspan=3 | None (district created)
|  | New seat.New member elected.Republican gain.
| nowrap | 

|-
! 
| Norman F. Lent
|  | Republican
| 1970
| Incumbent re-elected.
| nowrap | 

|-
! 
| John W. Wydler
|  | Republican
| 1962
| Incumbent re-elected.
| nowrap | 

|-
! rowspan=2 | 
| Seymour Halpern
|  | Republican
| 1958
|  | Incumbent retired.Republican loss.
| rowspan=2 nowrap | 

|-
| Lester L. Wolff
|  | Democratic
| 1964
| Incumbent re-elected.

|-
! 
| Joseph P. Addabbo
|  | Democratic
| 1960
| Incumbent re-elected.
| nowrap | 

|-
! 
| Benjamin Stanley Rosenthal
|  | Democratic
| 1962
| Incumbent re-elected.
| nowrap | 

|-
! 
| James J. Delaney
|  | Democratic
| 19441946 1948
| Incumbent re-elected.
| nowrap | 

|-
! 
| Mario Biaggi
|  | Democratic
| 1968
| Incumbent re-elected.
| nowrap | 

|-
! 
| Frank J. Brasco
|  | Democratic
| 1966
| Incumbent re-elected.
| nowrap | 

|-
! 
| Shirley Chisholm
|  | Democratic
| 1968
| Incumbent re-elected.
| nowrap | 

|-
! 
| Bertram L. Podell
|  | Democratic
| 1968
| Incumbent re-elected.
| nowrap | 

|-
! 
| John J. Rooney
|  | Democratic
| 1944
| Incumbent re-elected.
| nowrap | 

|-
! 
| Hugh Carey
|  | Democratic
| 1960
| Incumbent re-elected.
| nowrap | 

|-
! 
| Emanuel Celler
|  | Democratic
| 1922
|  | Incumbent lost renomination andlost re-election as a Liberal.New member elected.Democratic hold.
| nowrap | 

|-
! 
| John M. Murphy
|  | Democratic
| 1962
| Incumbent re-elected.
| nowrap | 

|-
! 
| Ed Koch
|  | Democratic
| 1968
| Incumbent re-elected.
| nowrap | 

|-
! 
| Charles B. Rangel
|  | Democratic
| 1970
| Incumbent re-elected.
| nowrap | 

|-
! rowspan=2 | 
| William Fitts Ryan
|  | Democratic
| 1960
|  | Died in officeDemocratic loss.
| rowspan=2 nowrap | 

|-
| Bella Abzug
|  | Democratic
| 1970
| Incumbent re-elected.

|-
! 
| Herman Badillo
|  | Democratic
| 1970
| Incumbent re-elected.
| nowrap | 

|-
! rowspan=2 | 
| James H. Scheuer
|  | Democratic
| 1964
|  | Incumbent lost renomination.Democratic loss.
| rowspan=2 nowrap | 

|-
| Jonathan Brewster Bingham
|  | Democratic
| 1964
| Incumbent re-elected.

|-
! 
| Peter A. Peyser
|  | Republican
| 1970
| Incumbent re-elected.
| nowrap | 

|-
! 
| Ogden R. Reid
|  | Democratic
| 1962
| Incumbent re-elected.
| nowrap | 

|-
! 
| Hamilton Fish IV
|  | Republican
| 1968
| Incumbent re-elected.
| nowrap | 

|-
! 
| John G. Dow
|  | Democratic
| 19641968 1970
|  | Incumbent lost re-election.New member elected.Republican gain.
| nowrap | 

|-
! 
| Howard W. Robison
|  | Republican
| 1958
| Incumbent re-elected.
| nowrap | 

|-
! 
| Samuel S. Stratton
|  | Democratic
| 1958
| Incumbent re-elected.
| nowrap | 

|-
! 
| Carleton J. King
|  | Republican
| 1960
| Incumbent re-elected.
| nowrap | 

|-
! 
| Robert C. McEwen
|  | Republican
| 1964
| Incumbent re-elected.
| nowrap | 

|-
! 
| Alexander Pirnie
|  | Republican
| 1958
|  | Incumbent retired.New member elected.Republican hold.
| nowrap | 

|-
! 
| James M. Hanley
|  | Democratic
| 1964
| Incumbent re-elected.
| nowrap | 

|-
! 
| John H. Terry
|  | Republican
| 1970
|  | Incumbent retired.New member elected.Republican hold.
| nowrap | 

|-
! 
| Frank Horton
|  | Republican
| 1962
| Incumbent re-elected.
| nowrap | 

|-
! 
| Barber Conable
|  | Republican
| 1964
| Incumbent re-elected.
| nowrap | 

|-
! 
| Henry P. Smith III
|  | Republican
| 1964
| Incumbent re-elected.
| nowrap | 

|-
! 
| Thaddeus J. Dulski
|  | Democratic
| 1958
| Incumbent re-elected.
| nowrap | 

|-
! 
| Jack Kemp
|  | Republican
| 1970
| Incumbent re-elected.
| nowrap | 

|-
! 
| James F. Hastings
|  | Republican
| 1968
| Incumbent re-elected.
| nowrap | 

|}

North Carolina 

|-
! 
| Walter B. Jones Sr.
|  | Democratic
| 1966
| Incumbent re-elected.
| nowrap | 

|-
! 
| Lawrence H. Fountain
|  | Democratic
| 1952
| Incumbent re-elected.
| nowrap | 

|-
! 
| David N. Henderson
|  | Democratic
| 1960
| Incumbent re-elected.
| nowrap | 

|-
! 
| Nick Galifianakis
|  | Democratic
| 1966
|  | Retired to run for U.S. Senator.New member elected.Democratic hold.
| nowrap | 

|-
! 
| Wilmer Mizell
|  | Republican
| 1968
| Incumbent re-elected.
| nowrap | 

|-
! 
| L. Richardson Preyer
|  | Democratic
| 1968
| Incumbent re-elected.
| nowrap | 

|-
! 
| Alton Lennon
|  | Democratic
| 1956
|  | Incumbent retired.New member elected.Democratic hold.
| nowrap | 

|-
! 
| Earl B. Ruth
|  | Republican
| 1968
| Incumbent re-elected.
| nowrap | 

|-
! 
| Charles R. Jonas
|  | Republican
| 1952
|  | Incumbent retired.New member elected.Republican hold.
| nowrap | 

|-
! 
| Jim Broyhill
|  | Republican
| 1962
| Incumbent re-elected.
| nowrap | 

|-
! 
| Roy A. Taylor
|  | Democratic
| 1960
| Incumbent re-elected.
| nowrap | 

|}

North Dakota 

|-
! rowspan=2 | 
| Mark Andrews
|  | Republican
| 1963 
| Incumbent re-elected.
| rowspan=2 nowrap | 

|-
| Arthur A. Link
|  | Democratic
| 1970
|  | Retired to run for GovernorDemocratic loss.

|}

Ohio 

|-
! 
| William J. Keating
|  | Republican
| 1970
| Incumbent re-elected.
| nowrap | 

|-
! 
| Donald D. Clancy
|  | Republican
| 1960
| Incumbent re-elected.
| nowrap | 

|-
! 
| Charles W. Whalen Jr.
|  | Republican
| 1966
| Incumbent re-elected.
| nowrap | 

|-
! rowspan=2 | 
| William Moore McCulloch
|  | Republican
| 1947 
|  | Incumbent retired.New member elected.Republican hold.
| rowspan=2 nowrap | 

|-
| Jackson Edward Betts
|  | Republican
| 1950
|  | Incumbent retired.Republican loss.

|-
! 
| Del Latta
|  | Republican
| 1958
| Incumbent re-elected.
| nowrap | 

|-
! 
| Bill Harsha
|  | Republican
| 1960
| Incumbent re-elected.
| nowrap | 

|-
! 
| Clarence J. Brown Jr.
|  | Republican
| 1965 
| Incumbent re-elected.
| nowrap | 

|-
! 
| Walter E. Powell
|  | Republican
| 1970
| Incumbent re-elected.
| nowrap | 

|-
! 
| Thomas L. Ashley
|  | Democratic
| 1954
| Incumbent re-elected.
| nowrap | 

|-
! 
| Clarence E. Miller
|  | Republican
| 1966
| Incumbent re-elected.
| nowrap | 

|-
! 
| J. William Stanton
|  | Republican
| 1964
| Incumbent re-elected.
| nowrap | 

|-
! 
| Samuel L. Devine
|  | Republican
| 1958
| Incumbent re-elected.
| nowrap | 

|-
! 
| Charles Adams Mosher
|  | Republican
| 1960
| Incumbent re-elected.
| nowrap | 

|-
! 
| John F. Seiberling
|  | Democratic
| 1970
| Incumbent re-elected.
| nowrap | 

|-
! 
| Chalmers P. Wylie
|  | Republican
| 1966
| Incumbent re-elected.
| nowrap | 

|-
! 
| Frank T. Bow
|  | Republican
| 1950
|  | Incumbent retired.New member elected.Republican hold.
| nowrap | 

|-
! 
| John M. Ashbrook
|  | Republican
| 1960
| Incumbent re-elected.
| nowrap | 

|-
! 
| Wayne L. Hays
|  | Democratic
| 1948
| Incumbent re-elected.
| nowrap | 

|-
! 
| Charles J. Carney
|  | Democratic
| 1970
| Incumbent re-elected.
| nowrap | 

|-
! 
| James V. Stanton
|  | Democratic
| 1970
| Incumbent re-elected.
| nowrap | 

|-
! 
| Louis Stokes
|  | Democratic
| 1968
| Incumbent re-elected.
| nowrap | 

|-
! 
| Charles Vanik
|  | Democratic
| 1954
| Incumbent re-elected.
| nowrap | 

|-
! 
| William Edwin Minshall Jr.
|  | Republican
| 1954
| Incumbent re-elected.
| nowrap | 

|}

Oklahoma 

|-
! 
| Page Belcher
|  | Republican
| 1950
|  | Incumbent retired.New member elected.Democratic gain.
| nowrap | 

|-
! 
| Ed Edmondson
|  | Democratic
| 1952
|  | Retired to run for U.S. Senator.New member elected.Democratic hold.
| nowrap | 

|-
! 
| Carl Albert
|  | Democratic
| 1946
| Incumbent re-elected.
| nowrap | 

|-
! 
| Tom Steed
|  | Democratic
| 1948
| Incumbent re-elected.
| nowrap | 

|-
! 
| John Jarman
|  | Democratic
| 1950
| Incumbent re-elected.
| nowrap | 

|-
! 
| John Newbold Camp
|  | Republican
| 1968
| Incumbent re-elected.
| nowrap | 

|}

Oregon 

|-
! 
| Wendell Wyatt
|  | Republican
| 1964
| Incumbent re-elected.
| nowrap | 

|-
! 
| Albert C. Ullman
|  | Democratic
| 1956
| Incumbent re-elected.
| nowrap | 

|-
! 
| Edith Green
|  | Democratic
| 1954
| Incumbent re-elected.
| nowrap | 

|-
! 
| John R. Dellenback
|  | Republican
| 1966
| Incumbent re-elected.
| nowrap | 

|}

Pennsylvania 

|-
! 
| William A. Barrett
|  | Democratic
| 19441946 1948
| Incumbent re-elected.
| nowrap | 

|-
! 
| Robert N. C. Nix Sr.
|  | Democratic
| 1958
| Incumbent re-elected.
| nowrap | 

|-
! rowspan=2 | 
| James A. Byrne
|  | Democratic
| 1952
|  | Incumbent lost renomination.Democratic loss.
| rowspan=2 nowrap | 

|-
| William J. Green III
|  | Democratic
| 1964
| Incumbent re-elected.

|-
! 
| Joshua Eilberg
|  | Democratic
| 1966
| Incumbent re-elected.
| nowrap | 

|-
! 
| John H. Ware III
|  | Republican
| 1970
| Incumbent re-elected.
| nowrap | 

|-
! 
| Gus Yatron
|  | Democratic
| 1968
| Incumbent re-elected.
| nowrap | 

|-
! 
| Lawrence G. Williams
|  | Republican
| 1966
| Incumbent re-elected.
| nowrap | 

|-
! 
| Edward G. Biester Jr.
|  | Republican
| 1966
| Incumbent re-elected.
| nowrap | 

|-
! 
| colspan=3 | None (district created)
|  | New seat.New member elected.Republican gain.
| nowrap | 

|-
! 
| Joseph M. McDade
|  | Republican
| 1962
| Incumbent re-elected.
| nowrap | 

|-
! 
| Daniel J. Flood
|  | Democratic
| 19441946 19481952 1954
| Incumbent re-elected.
| nowrap | 

|-
! rowspan=2 | 
| J. Irving Whalley
|  | Republican
| 1960
|  | Incumbent retired.Republican loss.
| rowspan=2 nowrap | 

|-
| John P. Saylor
|  | Republican
| 1949 
| Incumbent re-elected.

|-
! 
| R. Lawrence Coughlin
|  | Republican
| 1968
| Incumbent re-elected.
| nowrap | 

|-
! 
| William S. Moorhead
|  | Democratic
| 1958
| Incumbent re-elected.
| nowrap | 

|-
! 
| Fred B. Rooney
|  | Democratic
| 1963 
| Incumbent re-elected.
| nowrap | 

|-
! 
| Edwin D. Eshleman
|  | Republican
| 1966
| Incumbent re-elected.
| nowrap | 

|-
! 
| Herman T. Schneebeli
|  | Republican
| 1960
| Incumbent re-elected.
| nowrap | 

|-
! 
| H. John Heinz III
|  | Republican
| 1971 
| Incumbent re-elected.
| nowrap | 

|-
! 
| George Atlee Goodling
|  | Republican
| 19601964 1966
| Incumbent re-elected.
| nowrap | 

|-
! 
| Joseph M. Gaydos
|  | Democratic
| 1968
| Incumbent re-elected.
| nowrap | 

|-
! 
| John H. Dent
|  | Democratic
| 1958
| Incumbent re-elected.
| nowrap | 

|-
! rowspan=2 | 
| Thomas E. Morgan
|  | Democratic
| 1944
| Incumbent re-elected.
| rowspan=2 nowrap | 

|-
| William Sheldrick Conover
|  | Republican
| 1972 
|  | Incumbent lost renomination.Republican loss.

|-
! 
| Albert W. Johnson
|  | Republican
| 1963 
| Incumbent re-elected.
| nowrap | 

|-
! 
| Joseph P. Vigorito
|  | Democratic
| 1964
| Incumbent re-elected.
| nowrap | 

|-
! 
| Frank M. Clark
|  | Democratic
| 1954
| Incumbent re-elected.
| nowrap | 

|}

Rhode Island 

|-
! 
| Fernand St. Germain
|  | Democratic
| 1960
| Incumbent re-elected.
| nowrap | 

|-
! 
| Robert Tiernan
|  | Democratic
| 1967 
| Incumbent re-elected.
| nowrap | 

|}

South Carolina 

|-
! 
| Mendel Jackson Davis
|  | Democratic
| 1971 
| Incumbent re-elected.
| nowrap | 

|-
! 
| Floyd Spence
|  | Republican
| 1970
| Incumbent re-elected.
| nowrap | 

|-
! 
| William Jennings Bryan Dorn
|  | Democratic
| 19461948 1950
| Incumbent re-elected.
| nowrap | 

|-
! 
| James R. Mann
|  | Democratic
| 1968
| Incumbent re-elected.
| nowrap | 

|-
! 
| Thomas S. Gettys
|  | Democratic
| 1964
| Incumbent re-elected.
| nowrap | 

|-
! 
| John L. McMillan
|  | Democratic
| 1938
|  | Incumbent lost renomination.New member elected.Republican gain.
| nowrap | 

|}

South Dakota 

|-
! 
| Frank E. Denholm
|  | Democratic
| 1970
| Incumbent re-elected.
| nowrap | 

|-
! 
| James Abourezk
|  | Democratic
| 1970
|  | Retired to run for U.S. Senator.New member elected.Republican gain.
| nowrap | 

|}

Tennessee 

|-
! 
| Jimmy Quillen
|  | Republican
| 1962
| Incumbent re-elected.
| nowrap | 

|-
! 
| John Duncan Sr.
|  | Republican
| 1964
| Incumbent re-elected.
| nowrap | 

|-
! 
| LaMar Baker
|  | Republican
| 1970
| Incumbent re-elected.
| nowrap | 

|-
! 
| Joe L. Evins
|  | Democratic
| 1946
| Incumbent re-elected.
| nowrap | 

|-
! 
| Richard Fulton
|  | Democratic
| 1962
| Incumbent re-elected.
| nowrap | 

|-
! rowspan=2 | 
| William Anderson
|  | Democratic
| 1964
|  | Incumbent lost re-election.New member elected.Republican gain.
| rowspan=2 nowrap | 

|-
| Ray Blanton
|  | Democratic
| 1966
|  | Incumbent retired to run for U.S. senator.Democratic loss.

|-
! 
| Ed Jones
|  | Democratic
| 1969 
| Incumbent re-elected.
| nowrap | 

|-
! 
| Dan Kuykendall
|  | Republican
| 1966
| Incumbent re-elected.
| nowrap | 

|}

Texas 

|-
! 
| Wright Patman
|  | Democratic
| 1928
| Incumbent re-elected.
| nowrap | 

|-
! 
| John Dowdy
|  | Democratic
| 1952
|  | Incumbent retired.New member elected.Democratic hold.
| nowrap | 

|-
! 
| James M. Collins
|  | Republican
| 1968
| Incumbent re-elected.
| nowrap | 

|-
! 
| Ray Roberts
|  | Democratic
| 1962
| Incumbent re-elected.
| nowrap | 

|-
! 
| Earle Cabell
|  | Democratic
| 1964
|  | Incumbent lost re-election.New member elected.Republican gain.
| nowrap | 

|-
! 
| Olin E. Teague
|  | Democratic
| 1946
| Incumbent re-elected.
| nowrap | 

|-
! 
| William Reynolds Archer Jr.
|  | Republican
| 1970
| Incumbent re-elected.
| nowrap | 

|-
! 
| Robert C. Eckhardt
|  | Democratic
| 1966
| Incumbent re-elected.
| nowrap | 

|-
! 
| Jack Brooks
|  | Democratic
| 1952
| Incumbent re-elected.
| nowrap | 

|-
! 
| J. J. Pickle
|  | Democratic
| 1963 
| Incumbent re-elected.
| nowrap | 

|-
! 
| William R. Poage
|  | Democratic
| 1936
| Incumbent re-elected.
| nowrap | 

|-
! 
| Jim Wright
|  | Democratic
| 1954
| Incumbent re-elected.
| nowrap | 

|-
! rowspan=2 | 
| Graham B. Purcell Jr.
|  | Democratic
| 1962
|  | Incumbent lost re-election.Democratic loss.
| rowspan=2 nowrap | 

|-
| Robert Price
|  | Republican
| 1966
| Incumbent re-elected.

|-
! 
| John Andrew Young
|  | Democratic
| 1956
| Incumbent re-elected.
| nowrap | 

|-
! 
| Kika de la Garza
|  | Democratic
| 1964
| Incumbent re-elected.
| nowrap | 

|-
! 
| Richard Crawford White
|  | Democratic
| 1964
| Incumbent re-elected.
| nowrap | 

|-
! 
| Omar Burleson
|  | Democratic
| 1946
| Incumbent re-elected.
| nowrap | 

|-
! 
| colspan=3 | None (district created)
|  | New seat.New member elected.Democratic gain.
| nowrap | 

|-
! 
| George H. Mahon
|  | Democratic
| 1934
| Incumbent re-elected.
| nowrap | 

|-
! 
| Henry B. González
|  | Democratic
| 1961 
| Incumbent re-elected.
| nowrap | 

|-
! 
| O. C. Fisher
|  | Democratic
| 1942
| Incumbent re-elected.
| nowrap | 

|-
! 
| Robert R. Casey
|  | Democratic
| 1958
| Incumbent re-elected.
| nowrap | 

|-
! 
| Abraham Kazen
|  | Democratic
| 1966
| Incumbent re-elected.
| nowrap | 

|-
! 
| colspan=3 | None (district created)
|  | New seat.New member elected.Democratic gain.
| nowrap | 

|}

Utah 

|-
! 
| K. Gunn McKay
|  | Democratic
| 1970
| Incumbent re-elected.
| nowrap | 

|-
! 
| Sherman P. Lloyd
|  | Republican
| 19621964 1966
|  | Incumbent lost re-election.New member elected.Democratic gain.
| nowrap | 

|}

Vermont 

|-
! 
| Richard W. Mallary
|  | Republican
| 1972 
| Incumbent re-elected.
| nowrap | 

|}

Virginia 

|-
! 
| Thomas N. Downing
|  | Democratic
| 1958
| Incumbent re-elected.
| nowrap | 

|-
! 
| G. William Whitehurst
|  | Republican
| 1968
| Incumbent re-elected.
| nowrap | 

|-
! 
| David E. Satterfield III
|  | Democratic
| 1964
| Incumbent re-elected.
| nowrap | 

|-
! 
| Watkins Moorman Abbitt
|  | Democratic
| 1948
|  | Incumbent retired.New member elected.Republican gain.
| nowrap | 

|-
! 
| Dan Daniel
|  | Democratic
| 1968
| Incumbent re-elected.
| nowrap | 

|-
! 
| Richard Harding Poff
|  | Republican
| 1952
|  | Resigned to become justice of Supreme Court of VirginiaRepublican hold.
| nowrap | 

|-
! 
| J. Kenneth Robinson
|  | Republican
| 1970
| Incumbent re-elected.
| nowrap | 

|-
! 
| William L. Scott
|  | Republican
| 1966
|  | Retired to run for U.S. Senator.New member elected.Republican hold.
| nowrap | 

|-
! 
| William C. Wampler
|  | Republican
| 19521954 1966
| Incumbent re-elected.
| nowrap | 

|-
! 
| Joel T. Broyhill
|  | Republican
| 1952
| Incumbent re-elected.
| nowrap | 

|}

Washington 

|-
! 
| Thomas Pelly
|  | Republican
| 1952
|  | Incumbent retired.New member elected.Republican hold.
| nowrap | 

|-
! 
| Lloyd Meeds
|  | Democratic
| 1964
| Incumbent re-elected.
| nowrap | 

|-
! 
| Julia Butler Hansen
|  | Democratic
| 1960
| Incumbent re-elected.
| nowrap | 

|-
! 
| Mike McCormack
|  | Democratic
| 1970
| Incumbent re-elected.
| nowrap | 

|-
! 
| Tom Foley
|  | Democratic
| 1964
| Incumbent re-elected.
| nowrap | 

|-
! 
| Floyd Verne Hicks
|  | Democratic
| 1964
| Incumbent re-elected.
| nowrap | 

|-
! 
| Brock Adams
|  | Democratic
| 1964
| Incumbent re-elected.
| nowrap | 

|}

West Virginia 

|-
! 
| Bob Mollohan
|  | Democratic
| 19521956 1968
| Incumbent re-elected.
| nowrap | 

|-
! 
| Harley O. Staggers
|  | Democratic
| 1948
| Incumbent re-elected.
| nowrap | 

|-
! 
| John M. Slack Jr.
|  | Democratic
| 1958
| Incumbent re-elected.
| nowrap | 

|-
! rowspan=2 | 
| Ken Hechler
|  | Democratic
| 1958
| Incumbent re-elected.
| rowspan=2 nowrap | 

|-
| James Kee
|  | Democratic
| 1964
|  | Incumbent lost renomination.Democratic loss.

|}

Wisconsin 

|-
! 
| Les Aspin
|  | Democratic
| 1970
| Incumbent re-elected.
| nowrap | 

|-
! 
| Robert W. Kastenmeier
|  | Democratic
| 1958
| Incumbent re-elected.
| nowrap | 

|-
! 
| Vernon Wallace Thomson
|  | Republican
| 1960
| Incumbent re-elected.
| nowrap | 

|-
! 
| Clement J. Zablocki
|  | Democratic
| 1948
| Incumbent re-elected.
| nowrap | 

|-
! 
| Henry S. Reuss
|  | Democratic
| 1954
| Incumbent re-elected.
| nowrap | 

|-
! 
| William A. Steiger
|  | Republican
| 1966
| Incumbent re-elected.
| nowrap | 

|-
! rowspan=2 | 
| Dave Obey
|  | Democratic
| 1969 
| Incumbent re-elected.
| rowspan=2 nowrap | 

|-
| Alvin E. O'Konski
|  | Republican
| 1942
|  | Incumbent lost re-election.Republican loss.

|-
! 
| John W. Byrnes
|  | Republican
| 1944
|  | Incumbent retired.New member elected.Republican hold.
| nowrap | 

|-
! 
| Glenn R. Davis
|  | Republican
| 1947 1956 1964
| Incumbent re-elected.
| nowrap | 

|}

Wyoming 

|-
! 
| Teno Roncalio
|  | Democratic
| 19641966 1970
| Incumbent re-elected.
| nowrap | 

|}

Non-voting delegates 

The non-voting delegate to the House of Representatives from the District of Columbia is elected for two-year terms, as are all other Representatives and Delegates minus the Resident Commissioner of Puerto Rico, who is elected to a four-year term.

District of Columbia 

The election for the Delegate from the District of Columbia featured winner Walter E. Fauntroy (D), who won his first re-election after winning the special election in the previous year.

Walter E. Fauntroy, a Democrat, sought re-election for his second term to the United States House of Representatives. Fauntroy was opposed in this election by Republican challenger William Chin-Lee who received 25.12%, and Statehood Party candidate Charles I. Cassell who received 11.92%.  This resulted in Fauntroy being elected with 60.64% of the vote.

United States Virgin Islands 

Democrat Ron de Lugo was elected as the first delegate from United States Virgin Islands's at-large congressional district.

See also 
 1972 United States elections
 1972 United States gubernatorial elections
 1972 United States Senate elections
 92nd United States Congress
 93rd United States Congress

Notes

References